The Baltimore International was a men's tennis tournament played at the Towson State College in Baltimore, Maryland from 1972 until 1980 and in 1982. The event was part of the USLTA-IPA Indoor Circuit from 1972 through 1976. In 1977, 1979 and 1980 it was an event on the  Grand Prix Circuit and in its final year, 1982, it formed part of the WCT Tour. The tournament was played on indoor carpet courts.

Finals

Singles

Doubles

External links
 ATP World Tour archive

World Championship Tennis
Defunct tennis tournaments in the United States
Grand Prix tennis circuit
Baltimore